The Autostrada A31 is an Italian motorway which connects the trunk road SS434 "Transpolesana" (near Badia Polesine) with the town of Piovene Rocchette. The A31 is interconnected with the A4 motorway in the city of Vicenza. It is also known as the "Autostrada Valdastico" or "Autostrada della Val d'Astico".

There are plans for an extension north of the motorway, connecting with A22 near Besenello.

The operator of the road was Autostrada Brescia Verona Vicenza Padova of A4 Holding.

Gallery

References

Buildings and structures completed in 1976
Autostrade in Italy
Transport in Veneto